William "Bill" Morgan (born 2 March 1975) is a Canadian judoka who represented Canada in Judo at the 2000, 2004, and 2008 Paralympics. He placed seventh in the -81 kg category, fifth in the -81 kg category, and seventh in the -100 kg category, respectively, and in 2004 and 2008 was Canada's only competitor in Judo. Morgan won bronze at the International Blind Sports World Championships in 2006.

See also
Judo in Ontario
Judo in Canada
List of Canadian judoka

References

External links
William Morgan explaining Paralympic Judo (ParalympicSport.TV on YouTube)

Living people
Canadian male judoka
Paralympic judoka of Canada
1975 births
Sportspeople from Parry Sound, Ontario